The Colombia national handball team is the team of national players Colombia representing the Colombian Federation of Handball in international competitions organized by the International Handball Federation (IHF) or the International Olympic Committee (IOC).
Never participated in the Olympic Games and world, only participates in the Pan. In recent years the discipline is growing.

Competition record

Pan American Championship

Junior Pan American Games

Central American and Caribbean Games

Caribbean Handball Cup

Bolivarian Games

IHF South and Central American Emerging Nations Championship

IHF Emerging Nations Championship

References

External links

IHF profile

Men's national handball teams
National sports teams of Colombia